The 2009–10 LSU Lady Tigers basketball team is representing Louisiana State University in the 2009–10 NCAA Division I basketball season. The Lady Tigers are coached by Van Chancellor and are a member of the Southeastern Conference.

Offseason
May 6: LSU All-Southeastern Conference guard Allison Hightower is one of 29 student-athletes from across the country who have been invited to participate in the USA Basketball World University Games Team Trials.
May 15: Former LSU women's basketball All-American Sylvia Fowles led a group of 48 student-athletes who received degrees
May 17: LSU forward LaSondra Barrett was named one of 14 finalists for the 2009 USA Basketball Women’s U19 World Championship Team following the completion of a three-day training camp on Sunday afternoon at the U.S. Olympic Training Center.
July 30: The Women's Basketball Coaches Association (WBCA), on behalf of the Wade Coalition, announced the 2009-2010 preseason "Wade Watch" list for The State Farm Wade Trophy Division I Player of the Year. Louisiana State’s Allison Hightower has been named to the 2009-10 preseason "Wade Watch" list, which is made up of top NCAA Division I student-athletes who best embody the spirit of Lily Margaret Wade. This is based on the following criteria: game and season statistics, leadership, character, effect on their team and overall playing ability.
August 21: The 2009-10 preseason candidates list for the Women’s Wooden Award was released, naming 31 student athletes. Allison Hightower from LSU was one of the candidates.

Regular season

Roster

Schedule

Player stats

Postseason

NCAA basketball tournament

Awards and honors

Team players drafted into the WNBA

See also
2009–10 NCAA Division I women's basketball season

References

External links
Official Site

Lsu
LSU Lady Tigers basketball seasons
LSU
LSU
LSU